The Calcários Micríticos da Serra de Aire is a Bathonian geologic formation in Portugal. Fossil sauropod tracks have been reported from the formation.

Fossil content 
 Megalosauripus sp.
 Sauropoda indet.

See also 
 Pegadas de Dinossáurios da Serra de Aire Natural Monument
 List of dinosaur-bearing rock formations
 List of stratigraphic units with sauropodomorph tracks
 Sauropod tracks

References

Bibliography 
 V. F. Santos, J. J. Moratalla, and R. Royo-Torres. 2009. New sauropod trackways from the Middle Jurassic of Portugal. Acta Palaeontologica Polonica 54(3):409-422
 Weishampel, David B.; Dodson, Peter; and Osmólska, Halszka (eds.): The Dinosauria, 2nd, Berkeley: University of California Press. 861 pp. 
 V. F. dos Santos, M. G. Lockley, C. A. Meyer, J. Carvalho, A. M. Galopim Carvalho and J. J. Moratalla. 1995. A new sauropod tracksite from the Middle Jurassic of Portugal. In M. G. Lockley, V. F. dos Santos, C. A. Meyer, & A. P. Hunt (eds.), Aspects of Sauropod Paleobiology. GAIA 10:5-13

Geologic formations of Portugal
Jurassic System of Europe
Jurassic Portugal
Bathonian Stage
Limestone formations
Ichnofossiliferous formations
Paleontology in Portugal